A wedder or wedders refer to married person(s). It may also refer to:

 Wether Holm (disambiguation), several of the Shetland Islands, Scotland
 Thomas Wedders
 Gustav Weder, Swiss bobsledder
 shortening of Wedderborg